Vincent Van Patten (born October 17, 1957) is an American actor, former professional tennis player, and the commentator for the World Poker Tour.

Personal life
Van Patten was born in Bellerose, New York, as the youngest son of actor Dick Van Patten and his wife, Patricia Helon "Pat" Van Patten (née Poole), a former June Taylor dancer. He is of Dutch, English, and Italian descent.

He was first urged into show business at age nine by his father's agent. He appeared in more than thirty commercials, including Colgate toothpaste, before his father was cast in the TV series, Arnie, and moved his family from Long Island to Los Angeles.

From his first marriage to Betsy Russell he has two sons: Richard and Vince. His second marriage, on April 15, 2003, was to  The Young and the Restless actress Eileen Davidson; they have one child together.

Vince is related to several other well-known actors, actresses, and singers through blood and by marriage. Vince is a brother of James and Nels Van Patten, a nephew of Joyce Van Patten and Timothy Van Patten, and a cousin of Talia Balsam.

Acting
As a child actor during the 1970s, Van Patten guest-starred in over three dozen classic television series, including Bonanza, Gunsmoke,The High Chaparral, Nichols,  Medical Center, Adam-12, The Courtship of Eddie's Father, Wonder Woman, and a variety of television movies. He also had roles in the films Charley and the Angel (1973) and Chino (1973). At age 16, he was cast in Apple's Way, a CBS drama series, in which he played the son of an architect who leaves the big city to rear his family in rural and fictional Appleton, Iowa.

In the fall of 1975, at age 18, Van Patten appeared as John Karras in a 12-week CBS drama series Three for the Road. The story line is that of a father and two sons, grief-stricken over the death of their wife and mother, who sell their house, buy a recreational vehicle, and roam throughout the United States. In 1978, he co-starred in The Bionic Boy, a two-hour ABC attempted spinoff of the popular Lee Majors vehicle The Six Million Dollar Man, that never went to series. He made a guest appearance in the final episode of the NBC television anthology series $weepstake$ in 1979.

In 1978, Van Patten starred in the cult film classic Rock 'n' Roll High School. He starred in several other films in the 1970s and 1980s, including the 1979 action thriller Survival Run (aka Spree), Yesterday (1981) as a Vietnam war veteran, the slasher film Hell Night (1981), Gidget's Summer Reunion (1985), The Dirty Dozen: The Deadly Mission (1987), and Camp Fear (1991). He wrote, produced, and starred in The Break (1995), distributed by Lions Gate with Martin Sheen. Van Patten co-wrote and produced 7 Days to Vegas (2019), based on a true story, about a bet he made in 1995 that he could walk  from Los Angeles, California, to Las Vegas, Nevada, in seven days.

Tennis

Van Patten was a professional tour tennis player who in 1979 was awarded the Association of Tennis Professionals (ATP) Rookie of the Year award.  The highlight of his career came in 1981 when he defeated John McEnroe and two other top ten world ranked pros to win the Seiko World Super Tennis tournament in Tokyo. His career high ranking in singles was World No. 26, reached on February 11, 1982.

In singles, Van Patten reached the third round of the US Open twice, in 1982 and 1983, and Wimbledon once, in 1985. In doubles his best Grand Slam event result was reaching the quarter-finals of the French Open in 1981, partnering with Mel Purcell.  His highest doubles ranking was World No. 24, reached in September 1986.

Tennis Grand Prix Championship Series finals

Singles (1 title)

Poker
Van Patten learned to play poker at the age of 14 from his father, actor Dick Van Patten.

In the 1990s, Vincent Van Patten put together his own Hollywood home game with famous regulars like Ben Affleck and Tobey Maguire.

He finished in the money at the 2010 World Series of Poker main event, finishing 481st in a pool of 7,319 entrants and received winnings totaling $27,519. (This amount was awarded to finishers in 460th through 531st place.)

Since 2003, he has been a commentator on World Poker Tour. The first four seasons were broadcast on Travel Channel; seasons five and six on Game Show Network, and, from the seventh through to the current season, it has aired on Fox Sports Networks.

With Robert J Randisi, he wrote The Picasso Flop, a novel about Las Vegas poker.

As of September, 2020, Van Patten has $104,383 in live tournament earnings from seven events.

References

Bibliography

External links
 
 
 
 Van Patten profile, PokerListings.com 
 Vince Van Patten Interview (video + transcript)

1957 births
Living people
Male actors from New York City
American people of Dutch descent
American people of English descent
American people of Italian descent
American male film actors
American male tennis players
American sports announcers
American male television actors
Poker commentators
Tennis people from New York (state)
American male child actors
American poker players
20th-century American male actors
Writers from New York City
Van Patten family